Banco Nacional de Obras y Servicios Públicos, SNC (National Works and Public Services Bank) or Banobras is a state owned development bank in Mexico. Its core business is sub national (Municipal and State governments) and project finance. It was founded in 1933 as Banco Nacional Hipotecario Urbano y de Obras Públicas, S.A (National Urban Mortgage and Public Works Bank) by president Abelardo L. Rodríguez.

Until the 1985 Mexico City earthquake, its headquarters were located at the Torre Insignia, a pyramid-shaped building designed by one of Mexico's most noted architects, Mario Pani.

As of December 2005, the bank has a loan portfolio of more than US$10 billion and a tier 1 capital of more than a 1 billion.

See also

Alonso García Tamés

References

External links
Official web site

Banks established in 1933
Banks of Mexico
Companies based in Mexico City
Government of Mexico
Mexican companies established in 1933